The 2003 Super League Grand Final was the 6th official Grand Final conclusive and premiership-deciding match of Super League VIII. Held on Saturday 18 October 2003 at Old Trafford, Manchester, the game was played between Bradford Bulls and Wigan Warriors. The match was refereed Karl Kirkpatrick and watched by a crowd of 65,537, with Bradford winning 25 - 12.

Background

Route to the Final

Bradford Bulls
Bradford finished top of the table so qualified straight to the play-off semi-final. They were drawn at home to Leeds Rhinos and won 30–14 to qualify for the grand final.

Wigan Warriors
Wigan finished third in the table so had to play their way through three rounds of play-off matches. In the elimination play-off they beat Warrington 25–12, the semi-final saw them beat St Helens 40–24 and then in the elimination final they beat Leeds Rhinos 23–22 to set up the final against Bradford.

Match details

World Club Challenge

Having won the championship, the Bradford Bulls were to play 2003 NRL season premiers, the Penrith Panthers in the following February's World Club Challenge.

References

2003 Super League Grand Final at rlphotos.com

Super League Grand Finals
Wigan Warriors matches
Bradford Bulls matches
Grand final